Toni Schlesinger is a Chicago-native, New York City-based journalist, theater artist, and fiction writer. She is best known for her long-running “Shelter” column in The Village Voice (1997–2006) and New York Observer (2006–07). A selection of the Voice pieces is gathered in the book Five Flights Up (Princeton Architectural Press 2006), which Tom Hanks hailed as a must-read and about which playwright Tony Kushner wrote, “Toni Schlesinger’s book describes this relationship of the accidental to the profound, the domestic to the totally weird; she visits, draws out and celebrates this permanent impermanence better than anyone ever has.” Previously, Schlesinger was a writer and columnist for the Chicago Reader (1977–1992), where she first collaborated with illustrator Tom Bachtell.

Schlesinger's theatrical career as a writer, designer and performer—though obviously an influence on her interviewing style—holds a unique position in New York City's Off-Off Broadway tradition.

Among her produced works include:

 "The Mystery of Pearl Street" at Dixon Place, 2014; inspired her seventeen-year investigation of the real-life 1997 disappearance and presumed murder of artists Camden Sylvia and Michael Sullivan following a dispute with their landlord.

Reviewing the play, Village Voice critic Alexis Soloski observed that the "material is genuinely fascinating." 

 "The Mystery of Oyster Street" at Dixon Place, 2012; a fictional, two-person interrogation play starring Drew Hildebrand and Esme Von Hoffman
 "When The World Broke In Two: A Visit With Willa Cather" Metropolitan Playhouse, 2010 
 "The Toni Schlesinger Show," Puppet Lab at St Ann's Warehouse, 2007 
 "Lobster Village," at HERE's Dream Music Puppetry Program at the Great Small Works Toy Festival, 2003, for two puppets.

References

Identity Theory interview with Toni Schlesinger
Toni Schlesinger Village Voice archive
Believer magazine Five Flights Up profile
Toni Schlesinger New York Observer archive
Toni Schlesinger's piece "The Whip and the Bonnet" in Mr. Beller's Neighborhood

Living people
American women journalists
MacDowell Colony fellows
Year of birth missing (living people)
21st-century American women